Jazz Abstractions (subtitled John Lewis Presents Contemporary Music: Compositions by Gunther Schuller and Jim Hall) is a third stream album combining elements of jazz and classical music recorded in late 1960 for the Atlantic label.

Reception

Allmusic awarded the album 4 stars stating: "One of the most successful third stream efforts ...This is very interesting music".

Track listing
All compositions by Gunther Schuller except as indicated
 "Abstraction" - 4:06
 "Piece for Guitar & Strings" (Jim Hall) - 6:22
 "Variants on a Theme of John Lewis (Django)" - 10:15
 "Variant I" - 5:27
 "Variant II" - 1:38
 "Variant III" - 3:10
 "Variants on a Theme of Thelonious Monk (Criss-Cross)" - 15:23
 "Variant I" - 6:22
 "Variant II" - 1:49
 "Variant III" - 4:12
 "Variant IV" - 3:00

Personnel 
Gunther Schuller - arranger, conductor
Jim Hall - guitar
Ornette Coleman - alto saxophone (tracks 1 & 4)
Eric Dolphy - alto saxophone, bass clarinet, flute (tracks 3 & 4)
Robert DiDomenica - flute (tracks 3 & 4)
Bill Evans - piano (tracks 3 & 4)
Eddie Costa - vibraphone (tracks 3 & 4)
Charles Libove, Roland Vamos - violin 
Alfred Brown (track 2), Harry Zaratzian - viola
Joseph Tekula - cello 
Alvin Brehm (track 1), George Duvivier (tracks 3 & 4), Scott LaFaro - bass 
Sticks Evans - drums (tracks 1, 3 & 4)

References 

1961 albums
John Lewis (pianist) albums
Jim Hall (musician) albums
Albums conducted by Gunther Schuller
Albums produced by Nesuhi Ertegun
Atlantic Records albums